Hibernal may refer to:
Winter-related
Chlorpromazine, by trade name
Hibernal (grape), a variety of wine grape